Posada Górna  (Posada Horishnia) is a village in the administrative district of Gmina Rymanów, within Krosno County, Subcarpathian Voivodeship, in south-eastern Poland.

The village has a population of 1,600.

References

Villages in Krosno County